Albert Ernest Radford  (January 25, 1918 – April 12, 2006) was an American botanist active in the Southeastern United States. He was best known for his work as senior author of Manual of the Vascular Flora of the Carolinas, the definitive flora for North Carolina and South Carolina.

Biography

Radford was born in  Augusta, Georgia to Albert and Eloise Moseley Radford, one of nine children. He was educated at Junior College of Augusta, Furman University (B.S., 1939) and the University of North Carolina at Chapel Hill (Ph.D., 1948). He served in the 51st Engineer Combat Battalion of the United States Army during World War II and saw action in North Africa and Europe, including the Battle of the Bulge, for which his battalion was awarded the Croix de Guerre.

He and his wife (married 1941), Laurie Stewart Radford (1910–2004), had three children, David, John, and Linda. Albert was Professor of Botany at the University of North Carolina at Chapel Hill for forty years and director of the University of North Carolina Herbarium for 23 years.

Professionally, he served as President of the Elisha Mitchell Scientific Society and of the Southern Appalachian Botanical Club. Besides his academic work in botany, he was active in conservation of natural areas in the Southeastern United States. One of his most significant accomplishments was the discovery of an unusual plant community which has since become protected as Steven's Creek Heritage Preserve. Among his students was ethnobotanist James A. Duke. His grandson Phil Radford, served as the youngest executive director of Greenpeace, from 2009 to 2014.

Works

References 

 Burk, William R. and Alan S. Weakley (2006). Albert E. Radford-A Tribute. Castanea, September, 2006 (available from FindArticles).
 UNC Herbarium—article on Albert Radford, accessed 4 May 2006
 UNC Herbarium—article on Laurie Stewart Radford, accessed 4 May 2006
 North Carolina Botanical Garden—accessed 4 May 2006
 Columbia, Missouri, Missourian—obituary, accessed 4 May 2006

1918 births
2006 deaths
American botanists
Furman University alumni
University of North Carolina at Chapel Hill alumni
University of North Carolina at Chapel Hill faculty
People from Augusta, Georgia